St. James is a historic station on the Port Jefferson Branch of the Long Island Rail Road. The station is located on Lake Avenue and Railroad Avenue, just south of New York State Route 25A in St. James, Suffolk County, New York.

History 
St. James station was built in 1873, along the Smithtown and Port Jefferson Railroad in the northern part of the Town of Smithtown. The station house, designed by Calvin L'Hommedieu, remains the second-oldest existing station-house of the Long Island Rail Road, surpassed only by Hewlett station, which was originally built in 1869 by the South Side Railroad of Long Island. When the Flowerfield station to the east was abandoned in 1958, the commuters who previously used that depot at the Gyrodyne Company of America were redirected to the St. James and Stony Brook, New York depots. Until 1964, the station also contained an express house and an outhouse, both of which were demolished along with some trees to make room for an expanded parking lot, much to the chagrin of the community. The station is located within the Saint James District, which was added to the National Register of Historic Places in 1973.

The station faced two restoration projects in the MTA era. The first took place in 1974, and the second took place in 1997, when the LIRR installed high-level platforms at the station.

No buses stop at the station. However, local suburban taxicab service is available, and the station serves as a stop along New York State Bicycle Route 25. The only modifications to the depot in recent years have been to make the station more accessible to the disabled.

Station layout
This station has one 12-car-long high-level side platform north of the track.

Image gallery

References

External links

Sant James Station, March 1999 (Unofficial LIRR History Website)
St. James Station Historical Restoration Project; March 21, 1997 (TrainsAreFun)
Cover, Pages 1 & 2
Flickr Photo
 Station from Lake Avenue from Google Maps Street View

Long Island Rail Road stations in Suffolk County, New York
Railway stations in the United States opened in 1873
Smithtown, New York
1873 establishments in New York (state)
Historic district contributing properties in New York (state)
National Register of Historic Places in Suffolk County, New York
Railway stations on the National Register of Historic Places in New York (state)